Nong U is a commune (xã) and village of the Điện Biên Đông District of Điện Biên Province, northwestern Vietnam. The commune covers an area of 79 square kilometres and has a reported population of 2478.

References

Communes of Điện Biên province
Populated places in Điện Biên province